Afro-Surrealism (also Afro-surrealism, AfroSurrealism) is a genre or school of art and literature. In 1974, Amiri Baraka used the term to describe the work of Henry Dumas. D. Scot Miller in 2009 wrote "The Afro-surreal Manifesto" in which he says, "Afro-Surrealism sees that all 'others' who create from their actual, lived experience are surrealist..."  The manifesto delineates Afro-Surrealism from Surrealism and Afro-Futurism. The manifesto lists ten tenets that Afro-Surrealism follows including how "Afro-Surrealists restore the cult of the past," and how "Afro-Surreal presupposes that beyond this visible world, there is an invisible world striving to manifest, and it is our job to uncover it."

Afro-Surrealism, is practiced and embodied in music, photography, film, the visual arts and poetry. Notable practitioners and inspirations of Afro-Surrealism include Ted Joans, Bob Kaufman, Krista Franklin, Aimé Césaire, Suzanne Césaire, Léopold Sédar Senghor, René Ménil, Kool Keith, Terence Nance, Will Alexander, Kara Walker, Samuel R. Delany, and Romare Bearden.

Influence 

D. Scot Miller penned "The Afro-surreal Manifesto" for The San Francisco Bay Guardian in May, 2009. Until that time, the term "Afro-surreal Expressionism" was used solely by Amiri Baraka to describe the writings of Henry Dumas. Later that year, Miller spoke with Baraka about extending the term by shortening the description. It was agreed by the two of them that "Afro-surreal" without the "expressionism" would allow further exploration of the term. Afro-surrealism may have some similar origins to surrealism in the mid-1920s, in that an aspect of it Négritude came after André Breton wrote the Surrealist Manifesto, but as Leopold Senghor points out in Miller's manifesto, "European Surrealism is empirical. African Surrealism is mystical and metaphorical."

Afro-Surrealism incorporates aspects of the Harlem Renaissance, Négritude and Black Radical Imagination as described by Professor Robin DG Kelley in his book Freedom Dreams: The Black Radical Imagination, and further with his Afro-surreal historical anthology, Black, Brown, & Beige: Surrealist Writings from Africa and the Diaspora (2009).  Aspects of Afro-Surrealism can be traced to Martiniquan Suzanne Césaire’s discussion of the “revolutionary impetus of surrealism” in the 1940s.

Though much has been written and said about artist/activist/statesmen Aimé Césaire, much more needs to written about his partner Suzanne, a surrealist thinker and an important figure in the history of the Afro-surreal aesthetic. Her quest for “The Marvelous” over the “miserablism”  expressed in the usual arts of protest inspired the Tropiques surrealist group, and especially René Ménil.

“The true task of mankind consists solely in the attempt to bring the marvelous into real life,” Ménil says in “Introduction to the Marvelous,”[1930s] “so that life can become more encompassing. So long as the mythic imagination is not able to overcome each and every boring mediocrity, human life will amount to nothing but useless, dull experiences, just killing time, as they say.”

Suzanne Césaire’s proclamation, "Be in permanent readiness for The Marvelous", quickly became a credo of the movement; the word "marvelous" has since become re-contextualized with regard to contemporary black arts and interventions.

In his 1956 essay for Présence Africaine, Haitian novelist Jacques Stephen Alexis wrote: "What, then, is the Marvellous, except the imagery in which a people wraps its experience, reflects its conception of the world and of life, its faith, its hope, its confidence in man, in a great justice, and the explanation which it finds for the forces antagonistic to progress?" In his work, Alexis is seen to have an acute sense of reality that is not unlike that of traditional surrealism, and his coining of the term "Marvelous Realism" reflects his influence by the earlier works of the Négritude/Black Surrealist Movement.

Development 
The term "Afro-surreal Expressionism" was coined by Amiri Baraka in his 1974 essay on Black Arts Movement avant-garde writer Henry Dumas.  Baraka notes that Dumas is able to write about ancient mysteries that were simultaneously relevant to the present day.

The future-past 
Unlike Afro-Futurism which speculates on possibilities in the future, Afro-surrealism, as Miller describes, is about the present. "Rather than speculate on the coming of the four horseman, Afrosurrealists understand that they rode through too long ago. Through Afro-surrealism, artists expose this form of the future past that is right now."

The everyday lived experience 

According to Terri Francis, "Afro-surrealism is art with skin on it where the texture of the object tells its story, how it weathered burial below consciousness, and how it emerged somewhat mysteriously from oceans of forgotten memories and discarded keepsakes. This photograph figures Afro-surrealism as bluesy, kinky-spooky."

Present day realism 
In the manifesto from which present day Afro-surrealism is based, writer D. Scot Miller states in a response to Afrofuturism:

"Afro-Futurism is a diaspora intellectual and artistic movement that turns to science, technology, and science fiction to speculate on black possibilities in the future. Afro-Surrealism is about the present. There is no need for tomorrow’s-tongue speculation about the future. Concentration camps, bombed-out cities, famines, and enforced sterilization have already happened. To the Afro-Surrealist, the Tasers are here. The Four Horsemen rode through too long ago to recall. What is the future? The future has been around so long it is now the past."

As The Afro-Surreal Manifesto and Afrofuturism come to the fore in artistic, commercial and academic circles, the struggle between the specific and “the scent” of present-day manifestations of Black absurdity has come with it, posing interesting challenges to both movements. For Afrofuturists, this challenge has been met by inserting Afrocentric elements into its growing pantheon, the intention being to centralize Afrofuturist focus back on the continent of Africa to enhance its specificity. For the Afro-surrealists, the focus has been set at the “here and now” of contemporary Black arts and situations in the Americas, Antilles, and beyond, searching for the nuanced “scent” of those current manifestations.

Examples of Afro-surrealist Works

Zong!, M. NourbSe Philip and Setaey Adamu Boateng 
InZong!, M. NourbSe Philip crafts a powerful counter-narrative surrounding the events of the Zong massacre. Utilizing the words from the legal decision to build her poetry, Philip rejects the idea of an archival past. Instead, Philip looks to the present moment to understand how to read this legal decision and understand the case. Following the footsteps of Toni Morrison’s Beloved, Philip presupposes the notion of a past that is not past allowing these past artifacts to haunt the present moment. Rather than organize the fragments, Philip allows the fragments to tell themselves. This is not to say that Philip gives the fragments voices, but instead gives them space. The space in the poem allows Philip’s audience to hear the silence of these voices, to truly understand the missing narratives form the past and the role that has on the present.

Beloved, Toni Morrison 
As mentioned earlier, Toni Morrison’sBeloved remains an important milestone for Afro-surrealists. Here, Morrison imagines a narrative of a slave women grieving the death of her baby daughter, Beloved. With no trace of a past, Beloved reappears on the steps of 124, confused and looking for her mother. Following this moment, the novel crafts a haunting tale of a woman seeking to understand the sudden reappearance of her daughter and the scars left behind from slavery. In Beloved, Morrison attempts to come to grip with the legacies left by slavery, challenging the notion that these legacies exits only in the past. From the epigraph, “Sixty Million and more,” Morrison presupposes there is no way to count those affected from slavery and additionally, that the number is ever-growing into the present. In her award-winning novel, Morrison expands the idea of the past, attempting to demonstrate the past is ever present.

Atlanta, Donald Glover 
Atlanta is an American comedy-drama television series created by Donald Glover that premiered on September 6, 2016, on FX. The series centers on college dropout and music manager Earnest "Earn" Marks (Glover) and rapper Paper Boi (Brian Tyree Henry) as they navigate a strange, seemingly otherworldly version of the Atlanta rap scene, examining racism, whiteness, existentialism and modern African-American culture through Afro-Surrealism. It also stars Lakeith Stanfield and Zazie Beetz.

Sorry to Bother You, Boots Riley 
Sorry to Bother You is a 2018 American surrealist urban fantasy science fiction black comedy film written and directed by Boots Riley, in his directorial debut. It stars Lakeith Stanfield, Tessa Thompson, Jermaine Fowler, Omari Hardwick, Terry Crews, Patton Oswalt, David Cross, Danny Glover, Steven Yeun, and Armie Hammer. The film follows a young black telemarketer who adopts a white accent to succeed at his job. Swept into a corporate conspiracy, he must choose between profit and joining his activist friends to organize labor.

References

African-American culture
African-American art
American contemporary art
American literary movements
Postcolonialism
African-American poetry